The Afar, also known as the Danakil, Adali and Odali, are a Cushitic-speaking ethnic group inhabiting the Horn of Africa. They primarily live in the Afar Region of Ethiopia and in northern Djibouti, as well as the entire southern coast of Eritrea. The Afar speak the Afar language, which is part of the Cushitic branch of the Afroasiatic family. Afars are the only inhabitants of the Horn of Africa whose traditional territories border both the Red Sea and the Gulf of Aden.

History

Early history

The earliest surviving written mention of the Afar is from the 13th-century Andalusian writer Ibn Sa'id, who reported that they inhabited the area around the port of Suakin, as far south as Mandeb, near Zeila. They are mentioned intermittently in Ethiopian records, first as helping Emperor Amda Seyon in a campaign beyond the Awash River, then over a century later when they assisted Emperor Baeda Maryam in a campaign against their neighbors, the Dobe'a.

According to sixteenth century Portuguese explorer Francisco Álvares, the kingdom of Dankali was confined by Abyssinia to its west and Adal Sultanate in the east.

Aussa States

Afar society has traditionally been organized into independent kingdoms, each ruled by its own Sultan. Among these were the Sultanate of Aussa, Sultanate of Girrifo, Sultanate of Dawe, Sultanate of Tadjourah, Sultanate of Rahaito, and Sultanate of Gobaad. In 1577, the Adal leader Imam Muhammed Jasa moved his capital from Harar to Aussa in modern Afar region. In 1647, the rulers of the Emirate of Harar broke away to form their own polity. Harari imams continued to have a presence in the southern Afar Region until they were overthrown in the eighteenth century by the Mudaito dynasty of Afar who later established the Sultanate of Aussa. The primary symbol of the Sultan was a silver baton, which was considered to have magical properties.

Afar Egyptian War 

From the account given by survivors on the 5th of October Werner Munzinger along with his wife and child arrived in Tadjoura with their errands being to open up the roads between Ankober, and Tadjoura to enter into communication with King Menelik of Shewa. He was also instructed to annex the Afar Sultanate of Aussa, and March further into areas like Wollo. His forces consisted of 350 soldiers, 2 guns, and 45 camels. On the 14th of November upon reaching Aussa the Egyptian forcers were attacked at night by a large number of Oromos. The Afar and Oromo forces managed to subdue the Egyptian army and destroyed their army leaving only a small number left which fled to Massawa. Amongst the Egyptian casualties were the martyrs of their leader Munzinger, his wife, and his child.

Pre-19th century
According to Elisée Reclus, Afar are divided into two groups, the Asaimara, and the Adoimara, these groups are further subdivided into upwards of one hundred and fifty sub-tribes according to their interests but all combine against the common enemy. The Modaitos who occupy the region of the lower Awash are the most powerful and no European traversed their territory without claiming the right of hospitality or the brotherhood of blood. Some Afars helped the Europeans by providing, for a fee, the security of Western caravans that circulated between the southern coast of the Red Sea and central Ethiopia. Towards the end of the 19th century, the sultanates of Raheita and Tadjoura on the coasts of the Red Sea have then colonized between European powers: Italy forms Italian Eritrea with Assab and Massawa, and France the French Somaliland in Djibouti, but the inland Aussa in the south was able to maintain its independence for longer. Even comparatively fertile and located on the Awash River, it was demarcated from the outside by surrounding desert areas.

War with Ethiopia

Ethiopia wanted to neutralize the Afar people and prevent them from helping the Italians during the course of the First Italo-Ethiopian War in 1895–1896. The show of Abyssinian force dissuaded the Afar sultan Mahammad Hanfare of the Sultanate of Aussa from honouring his treaties with Italy, and instead Hanfare secured a modicum of autonomy within the Ethiopian Empire by accepting Emperor Menelik indirect rule after the war.

Afar Liberation Front

 
When a modern administrative system was introduced in Ethiopia after the Second World War, the Afar areas controlled by Ethiopia were divided into the provinces of Eritrea, Tigray, Wollo, Shewa and Hararge. Tribal leaders, elders, and religious and other dignitaries of the Afar tried unsuccessfully in the government from 1961 to end this division. Following an unsuccessful rebellion led by the Afar Sultan, Alimirah Hanfare, the Afar Liberation Front was founded in 1975 to promote the interests of the Afar people. Sultan Hanfadhe was shortly afterward exiled to Saudi Arabia. Ethiopia's then-ruling communist Derg regime later established the Autonomous Region of Assab (now called Aseb and located in Eritrea), although low-level insurrection continued until the early 1990s. In Djibouti, a similar movement simmered throughout the 1980s, eventually culminating in the Afar Insurgency in 1991. After the fall of the Derg that same year, Sultan Hanfadhe returned from exile.

In March 1993, the Afar Revolutionary Democratic Front (ARDUF) was established. It constituted a coalition of three Afar organizations: the Afar Revolutionary Democratic Unity Union (ARDUU), founded in 1991 and led by Mohamooda Gaas (or Gaaz); the Afar Ummatah Demokrasiyyoh Focca (AUDF); and the Afar Revolutionary Forces (ARF). A political party, it aims to protect Afar interests. As of 2012, the ARDUF is part of the United Ethiopian Democratic Forces (UEDF) coalition opposition party.

Demographics

Geographical distribution

The Afar principally reside in the Danakil Desert in the Afar Region of Ethiopia, as well as in Eritrea and Djibouti. They number 2,276,867 people in Ethiopia (or 2.73% of the total population), of whom 105,551 are urban inhabitants, according to the most recent census (2007). The Afar make up over a third of the population of Djibouti, and are one of the nine recognized ethnic divisions (kililoch) of Ethiopia.

Language

Afars speak the Afar language as a mother tongue. It is part of the Cushitic branch of the Afroasiatic language family.

The Afar language is spoken by ethnic Afars in the Afar Region of Ethiopia, as well as in southern Eritrea and northern Djibouti. However, since the Afar are traditionally nomadic herders, Afar speakers may be found further afield.

Together, with the Saho language, Afar constitutes the Saho–Afar dialect cluster.

Society

Religion
Afar people are predominantly Muslim. They have a long association with Islam through the various local Muslim polities and practice the Sunni sect of Islam. A majority of the Afar had adopted Islam by the 13th century due to the expanding influence of holy men and traders from the Arabian peninsula. The Afar mainly follow the Shafi'i school of Sunni Islam. Sufi orders like the Qadiriyya are also widespread among the Afar. Afar religious life is somewhat syncretic with a blend of Islamic concepts and pre-Islamic ones such as rain sacrifices on sacred locations, divination, and folk healing.

Culture 
Socially, they are organized into clan families led by elders and two main classes: the asaimara ('reds') who are the dominant class politically, and the adoimara ('whites') who are a working class and are found in the Mabla Mountains. Clans can be fluid and even include outsiders like the (Issa clan).

In addition, the Afar are reputed for their martial prowess. Men traditionally carry the jile, a famous curved knife. They also have an extensive repertoire of battle songs.

The Afar are mainly livestock holders, primarily raising camels but also tending to goats, sheep, and cattle. However, shrinking pastures for their livestock and environmental degradation have made some Afar instead turn to cultivation, migrant labor, and trade. The Ethiopian Afar have traditionally engaged in salt trading but recently Tigrayans have taken much of this occupation.

See also
Afar Depression
Aussa Sultanate
Kwosso
Mudaito Dynasty

Notes

References
Mordechai Abir, The era of the princes: the challenge of Islam and the reunification of the Christian empire, 1769-1855 (London: Longmans, 1968).
J. Spencer Trimingham, Islam in Ethiopia (Oxford: Geoffrey Cumberlege for the University Press, 1952).

Further reading

External links

Omniglot - Afar language
Ethnologue - Afar - A Language of Ethiopia

 
Afroasiatic peoples
Cushitic-speaking peoples
Ethnic groups in Djibouti
Ethnic groups in Eritrea
Ethnic groups in Ethiopia
Ethnic groups in the Arab world
Pastoralists
Modern nomads
Muslim communities in Africa
African nomads